Banihal–Baramulla DEMU is a DEMU passenger train of the Indian Railways, which runs between Banihal railway station and Baramulla railway station, having 17 halts both within Jammu and Kashmir.

Nomenclature  

There are five sets of train currently being operated on daily basis. They are:

 74615/74616 Banihal–Baramula DEMU
 74619/74620 Banihal–Baramula DEMU
 74625/74626 Banihal–Baramula DEMU
 74627/74628 Banihal–Baramula DEMU
 74629/74630 Banihal–Baramula DEMU

Route and halts

The important halts of the train are:

Average speed and frequency

All sets of Banihal–Baramula DEMU runs with an average speed of 48 km/h and covers 135 km in 2 hrs 50 mins. While Baramula–Banihal DEMU runs with an average speed of 41 km/h and covers 135 km in 3 hrs 20 mins. There are 5 sets of trains which run on a daily basis.

See also 

 Srinagar railway station
 Budgam railway station
 Jammu–Baramulla line

Notes

References

External links 

 74625/Banihal–Baramula DEMU
 74626/Baramula–Banihal DEMU
 74627/Banihal–Baramula DEMU
 74628/Baramula–Banihal DEMU
 74629/Banihal–Baramula DEMU
 74630/Baramula–Banihal DEMU
 74615/Banihal–Baramula DEMU
 74616/Baramula–Banihal DEMU

Transport in Srinagar
Transport in Baramulla
Railway services introduced in 2008
Rail transport in Jammu and Kashmir
Diesel–electric multiple units of India
Railway services introduced in 2015